Turbett may refer to:
Turbett Township, Juniata County, Pennsylvania, a township in Juniata County, Pennsylvania, United States.
Philip Turbett, the British bassoonist and clarinetist.
Linda Turbett, the British recorder player and oboist